Bryotropha desertella is a moth of the family Gelechiidae. It is found in most of Europe, North Africa (Morocco), Turkey, Turkmenistan and the Russian Far East.

The wingspan is 11–16 mm. The forewings are greyish brown to ochreous brown, mottled with fuscous. The hindwings are pale brown, but darker towards the apex. Adults have been recorded on wing from early April to late September. In the north, there probably is one generation per year. In the south, there are two generations per year.

The larvae feed on  mosses such as Syntrichia ruraliformis, Homalothecium lutescens and Rhytidiadelphus squarrosus. They can be found in autumn and spring, and have a dark reddish brown body and a shining black head. Pupation takes place in a sandy cocoon.

References

External links
 ukmoths

Moths described in 1850
desertella
Moths of Europe
Moths of Africa
Moths of Asia